The 2017 Oklahoma Sooners football team represented the University of Oklahoma in the 2017 NCAA Division I FBS football season, the 123rd season of Sooner football. The team was led by Lincoln Riley, who was in his first year as head coach, after the retirement of Bob Stoops in June 2017. They played their home games at Gaylord Family Oklahoma Memorial Stadium in Norman, Oklahoma. They are a charter member of the Big 12 Conference.

Conference play began with a 49–41 win against Baylor in Waco, Texas and ended with a 59–31 win against West Virginia in Norman, Oklahoma. Oklahoma finished conference play with the best record in the conference with an 8–1 record. They went on to play TCU in the 2017 Big 12 Championship Game which they won 41–17 to win their twelfth Big 12 Championship and their third consecutive.

Oklahoma was selected as the 2nd seed to play in the 2017 College Football Playoff and lost to the 3rd seed Georgia in the Rose Bowl.

Sooners quarterback Baker Mayfield earned several national honors, including winning the school's sixth Heisman Trophy, distinguishing him as the best player in college football during the 2017 season. Mayfield threw for 4,627 yards and 43 passing touchdowns on the year, second in FBS in both categories. He broke his own NCAA FBS record for passing efficiency rating with a rating of 198.9.

Previous season 
The Sooners finished the 2016 season 11–2, 9–0 in Big 12 play to win their 10th Big 12 Championship. By winning the conference championship Oklahoma was selected to play in the Sugar Bowl where they defeated Auburn 35–19.

Coaching staff 
On June 7, 2017 Bob Stoops announced his retirement after 17 seasons as head coach. Offensive coordinator Lincoln Riley was promoted to head coach. On June 14, Riley hired former ECU head coach Ruffin McNeill to coach defensive tackles. With the offensive coordinator positions vacant Riley promoted Cale Gundy and Bill Bedenbaugh as co-coordinators, but Riley will continue to call plays for the season.

Roster

Schedule 
Oklahoma announced their 2017 football schedule on December 13, 2016. The 2017 schedule consisted of 6 home games, 5 away games and 1 neutral-site game in the regular season. The Sooners hosted two non-conference games against UTEP and Tulane and traveled to Ohio State. Oklahoma hosted Iowa State, Texas Tech, TCU, West Virginia and traveled to Baylor, Kansas, Kansas State, Oklahoma State in regular conference play. Oklahoma played the Texas Longhorns in Dallas, Texas at the Cotton Bowl stadium on October 14 for the Red River Showdown, the 112th game of the series.

Game summaries

UTEP 

To start the 2017 season, No. 7 Oklahoma hosted UTEP at home. It was Lincoln Riley's first game as head coach of the Sooners. Quarterback Baker Mayfield shined in a 56–7 rout of the Miners. Each team scored touchdowns on their first drives of the game, but Oklahoma shut out UTEP the rest of the way. Mayfield completed 19 of 20 passes, including 16 straight completions to start the game. He threw for 329 yards and three touchdowns in the game. Wide receiver Mark Andrews had a career high 134 receiving yards and seven receptions, all in the first half.

at Ohio State 

For the second game of the season, the No. 5 Sooners traveled to Columbus, Ohio for a highly anticipated matchup against No. 2 Ohio State, a game which many pundits speculated would have College Football Playoff implications. The previous season, Ohio State beat Oklahoma in Norman by a score of 45–24. Oklahoma was a 7.5-point underdog in the 2017 match-up according to Las Vegas sports books.

Both teams were held scoreless through the first quarter, and exchanged field goals for a 3–3 tie going into halftime. Each team scored touchdowns on their first drives of the second half, with Ohio State's J. K. Dobbins capping a 44-yard drive with a six-yard touchdown run, and Oklahoma answered with a 67-yard drive of their own which ended with a 36-yard touchdown pass from Baker Mayfield to Dimitri Flowers. Oklahoma scored two more unanswered touchdowns in the second half to take a 31–13 lead before a late Ohio State field goal made the final score 31–16. Baker Mayfield finished the game with 27 pass completions on 35 attempts, with 386 yards and three touchdowns. After the game, Mayfield sprinted around the Ohio State field with an Oklahoma flag before planting the flag at midfield.

Tulane 

Following the victory over Ohio State, No. 2 Oklahoma hosted Tulane in the first ever match-up between the two schools. The two teams were tied in the second quarter 14–14 before Oklahoma's Parnell Motley returned an interception 77 yards for a touchdown, after which the Sooners' coasted to a 56–14 victory. Quarterback Baker Mayfield passed for 331 yards and four touchdowns, while wide receiver CeeDee Lamb had 131 receiving yards and two touchdowns in the game.

at Baylor 

Oklahoma opened its Big 12 Conference schedule with a road game against Baylor. The Sooners were nearly upset by the Bears, who were winless with a record of 0–3 going into the game. The Bears scored a touchdown with 1:41 remaining in the game to bring the score to 49–41. Baylor recovered the onside kick and needed to score a touchdown to tie the game in the closing minutes. Bears quarterback Zach Smith fumbled the ball on the third play of the drive after being sacked by Oklahoma's Ogbonnia Okoronkwo, which was recovered by the Sooners, allowing them to run out the clock and win the game. Oklahoma's Abdul Adams had a 99-yard rushing touchdown in the first quarter, and had 164 rushing yards total in the game. Baker Mayfield threw for 283 yards and three touchdowns.

Iowa State 

After a bye week, Oklahoma played their second Big 12 Conference game, a home game against Iowa State. The Sooners were upset by the 31-point underdog Cyclones, 31–38. The game snapped Oklahoma's nation-leading 14 game win-streak, and 18-game win streak over Iowa State dating back to 1990. Iowa State backup quarterback Kyle Kempt, who had just two career pass attempts before this game, led the Cyclones to victory with 343 passing yards and three touchdowns.

Oklahoma took an early 17–3 lead early in the second quarter before taking a 24–13 lead into halftime. In the second half, Iowa State opened with two scoring drives while Oklahoma lost a fumble and missed a 44-yard field goal, bringing the score to 31–24 Iowa State with 12:46 remaining in the fourth quarter. Baker Mayfield led a 75-yard drive capped by a one-yard touchdown run by Dimitri Flowers to tie the game 31–31. Iowa State then had their own 75-yard drive, ending in what would be the decisive 25-yard touchdown pass from Kyle Kempt to Allen Lazard with 2:19 remaining. Oklahoma failed to convert on fourth down with 1:27 remaining, and Iowa State ran out the clock to complete the victory.

vs. Texas 

Following the loss to Iowa State, No. 12 Oklahoma traveled to Dallas, Texas to face Texas in the annual Red River Rivalry game. Oklahoma won the game 29–24. The Sooners jumped out to an early 20–0 lead by the mid-second quarter, but Texas scored on a 16-yard pass from Sam Ehlinger to Kyle Porter and then, off a Baker Mayfield interception, kicked a 34-yard field goal as time expired in the second quarter to bring the score to 20–10 entering the half. After an Oklahoma field goal and Texas touchdown brought the score to 23–17 Oklahoma, Texas took the lead with 8:01 remaining in the fourth quarter with an eight-yard touchdown run from quarterback Sam Ehlinger. Oklahoma responded with a three-play, 78-yard drive that ended in a 59-yard touchdown pass from Baker Mayfield to Mark Andrews with 6:53 to go in the game. The Sooner defense held Texas scoreless the rest of the game to secure the 29–24 victory. Baker Mayfield was 17 for 27 in passing attempts, finishing with 302 yards, two touchdowns and one interception.

at Kansas State 

Following the victory over Texas, No. 9 Oklahoma traveled to Manhattan, Kansas to play conference foe Kansas State. Oklahoma won the game 42–35. After a touchdown pass from Kansas State's Alex Delton to Isaiah Zuber with 2:25 remaining in the fourth quarter, the game was tied 35–35. Baker Mayfield led a drive down to the Kansas State 22-yard line with 24 seconds remaining, and then running back Rodney Anderson scored the game-winning 22-yard touchdown run with 7 seconds remaining. Anderson had 147 rushing yards and one touchdown, while Mayfield threw for 410 yards, two touchdowns, and one interception.

Texas Tech 

Following the win over Kansas State, Oklahoma played their homecoming game against Texas Tech. Oklahoma won the game 49–27. Both teams scored touchdowns on each of their first three drives, resulting in a 21–20 Oklahoma lead in the second quarter. The Sooners dominated the rest of the game, however, with the Red Raiders failing to score after their first drive in the second half. Oklahoma wide receiver CeeDee Lamb set school freshman records with nine receptions for 147 yards. Quarterback Baker Mayfield threw for 281 yards, four passing touchdowns and another touchdown on the ground.

at Oklahoma State 

Following the win over Texas Tech, the Sooners traveled to Stillwater, Oklahoma to play in-state rival Oklahoma State in the Bedlam Series. Oklahoma won the game 62–52. In an offensive shootout, the teams combined for 1,446 yards of total offense. After a rare Baker Mayfield interception on the third play of the game, the two teams traded touchdown drives for much of the first half. The score was 38–38 at the half, and Mayfield had a one-half school-record 387 passing yards. Leading 55–52 late in the fourth quarter, Oklahoma running back Trey Sermon scored the decisive touchdown on a 53-yard run with 54 seconds remaining. Mayfield finished with a career-high and school-record 598 passing yards, five touchdowns, and two interceptions. Wide receiver Marquise Brown caught nine passes for a school-record 265 receiving yards.

TCU 

Following the win over Oklahoma State, No. 5 Oklahoma returned to Norman for a top-10 match-up against TCU. Oklahoma won the game 38–20 in front of a record 88,308 fans at Gaylord Family Oklahoma Memorial Stadium. Oklahoma jumped out to an early lead due to several touchdown-capped drives by Baker Mayfield. The Sooners led 38–14 at the half. Both teams' offenses struggled to score in the second half, as an early-fourth quarter TCU touchdown was the only score of the half. Sooner running back Rodney Anderson had 290 yards from scrimmage and four touchdowns in the game.

at Kansas 

Following the win over TCU, No. 3 Oklahoma traveled to Lawrence, Kansas to play Kansas. The Sooners won in a 41–3 rout. Baker Mayfield led the Sooners with 257 passing yards and three touchdowns. There was major trash-talking during the game, as Mayfield generated controversy when he was caught on camera grabbing his crotch and cursing at the Kansas bench. Mayfield later released an apology for the incident.

West Virginia 

In their final game of the regular season, No. 3 Oklahoma faced West Virginia at home. The Sooners won the game 59–31. Quarterback Baker Mayfield, as punishment for his taunting act during the previous game against Kansas, did not start the game, his last game of his career in Norman. Mayfield was subbed into the game in the first quarter and the Sooners scored touchdowns on all five drives Mayfield played in before the half. Running back Rodney Anderson ran for 118 yards and four touchdowns in the game.

Big 12 Championship Game 

The Big 12 held its first football championship game since 2010 during the 2017 season. The championship game participants were to be the two conference members with the best conference records. Oklahoma earned its place in the game by finishing with a conference-best record of 8–1, and TCU finished in second with a conference record of 7–2. Thus, a rematch was set between the two teams, playing their second top-ten match-up in four weeks.

Oklahoma won the conference championship game and the Big 12 title by a score of 41–17. The Sooners jumped out to a quick 17–0 lead, in part thanks to an 18-yard fumble return for a touchdown by Caleb Kelly. After two touchdown drives led by TCU's Kenny Hill, the score was 24–17 at the half. Oklahoma's first offensive play of the second half was a 55-yard touchdown pass from Baker Mayfield to Mykel Jones, and their next drive concluded on a 52-yard touchdown connection between Mayfield and Marquise Brown. The Sooner defense surrendered zero points in the second half. Mayfield finished with 243 yards and four touchdowns in the win.

vs. Georgia (Rose Bowl) 

In the final College Football Playoff rankings of the 2017 season, Oklahoma was ranked second, which earned them a spot in the national semifinal game to be played at the 2018 Rose Bowl on New Year's Day. Their opponent was the third-seeded Georgia Bulldogs, champions of the Southeastern Conference. It was the first ever match-up between the two schools. The Rose Bowl winner would go on to play in the 2018 College Football Playoff National Championship.

Oklahoma lost in double overtime, 48–54, in a game many observers described as an "instant classic". It was the highest-ever scoring Rose Bowl game, and the first CFP game to go to overtime. The Sooners were the first to score, with a 13-yard pass from Baker Mayfield to Marquise Brown. Georgia's Sony Michel scored two first-half touchdowns, first on a 13-yard pass from Jake Fromm, then on a 75-yard run in the second quarter. With 13 seconds left in the first half, the Sooners scored on a trick play in which freshman wide receiver CeeDee Lamb threw a two-yard touchdown pass to quarterback Baker Mayfield. Oklahoma had a 31–17 lead at the end of the half. Their lead was chipped away by the Bulldogs early in the second half by two touchdowns by Sony Michel and Nick Chubb. A 46-yard fumble return touchdown by Oklahoma's Steven Parker gave Oklahoma the lead again late, but a two-yard touchdown run by Georgia's Nick Chubb tied the game 45–45 with 55 seconds left in regulation. In the first overtime, Georgia and Oklahoma exchanged field goals. In double overtime, Oklahoma kicker Austin Seibert's 27-yard field goal was blocked, and on the ensuing Georgia possession, running back Sony Michel won the game on a 27-yard touchdown run.

Rankings

Awards and honors

2018 NFL Draft 

The 2018 NFL Draft was held on April 26–28 in Arlington, Texas. Four Oklahoma players were selected as part of the draft, and five were signed to NFL teams as undrafted free agents. Baker Mayfield became the fourth Oklahoma player to be selected with the first overall pick, and the first since Sam Bradford in 2010.

References 

Oklahoma
Oklahoma Sooners football seasons
Big 12 Conference football champion seasons
Oklahoma Sooners football